Hankwang High School is a preparatory normal high school, located in Pyeongtaek city, Gyeonggi Province, South Korea. It was founded in 1955. The motto of the school is: Hold big dreams in your mind, And be loyal to the small things around you.

Objectives 

The school aims:
To provide students who are responsible and working hard
To provide students who think reasonably and positively
To provide students who have healthy body, and constructive and brave mind
To provide students who are sociable and love neighbors, serve to our society

History 
March 24, 1955 : Ministry of Education approved the establishment of the Hankwang educational foundation  
January 9, 1963 : Ministry of Education approved the establishment Hankwang high school as a coeducational school consisting of six classes
March 1, 1963 : First Principal Hong sung-young was appointed
January 5, 1968 : The coeducational school system was separated into Hankwang boy's high school and Hankwanh girl's high school
August 30, 1980 : Class numbers are extended to 30
May 17, 2010 : School yard improvement construction was completed
As of 2010, 15,820 students have been graduated

References

External links
Official website 

High schools in South Korea
Pyeongtaek
Schools in Gyeonggi Province
Educational institutions established in 1963
1963 establishments in South Korea
Boys' schools in South Korea